The 1963 Chicago Cubs season was the 92nd season of the Chicago Cubs franchise, the 88th in the National League, and the 48th at Wrigley Field. The Cubs finished seventh in the National League with a record of 82–80, marking their first winning season since 1946.

Offseason 
 October 17, 1962: Don Cardwell, George Altman and Moe Thacker were traded by the Cubs to the St. Louis Cardinals for Larry Jackson, Lindy McDaniel, and Jimmie Schaffer.
 November 26, 1962: Curt Motton was drafted from the Cubs by the Baltimore Orioles in the 1962 minor league draft.
 November 26, 1962: Glenn Beckert was drafted by the Cubs from the Boston Red Sox in the 1962 first-year draft.
 March 28, 1963: Dave Gerard and Danny Murphy were traded by the Cubs to the Houston Colt .45s for Hal Haydel, Dick LeMay and Merritt Ranew.

Regular season

Season standings

Record vs. opponents

Notable transactions 
 May 27, 1963: Ellis Burton was purchased by the Cubs from the Cleveland Indians.

Roster

Player stats

Batting

Starters by position 
Note: Pos = Position; G = Games played; AB = At bats; H = Hits; Avg. = Batting average; HR = Home runs; RBI = Runs batted in

Other batters 
Note: G = Games played; AB = At bats; H = Hits; Avg. = Batting average; HR = Home runs; RBI = Runs batted in

Pitching

Starting pitchers 
Note: G = Games pitched; IP = Innings pitched; W = Wins; L = Losses; ERA = Earned run average; SO = Strikeouts

Other pitchers 
Note: G = Games pitched; IP = Innings pitched; W = Wins; L = Losses; ERA = Earned run average; SO = Strikeouts

Relief pitchers 
Note: G = Games pitched; W = Wins; L = Losses; SV = Saves; ERA = Earned run average; SO = Strikeouts

Awards and honors 
All-Star Game
Larry Jackson, reserve
Ron Santo, reserve

Farm system 

Middlesboro affiliation shared with Chicago White Sox

Notes

References 

1963 Chicago Cubs season at Baseball Reference

Chicago Cubs seasons
Chicago Cubs season
Chicago Cubs